Caroline Fischer (born 4 April 1984) is a German pianist. She has given concerts around the world and has received several awards and prizes.

Musical education 
Caroline Fischer received her first piano lessons from her mother at the age of three. At the age of nine, she enrolled in the Julius Stern Institute at the Berlin University of the Arts. She began her studies at the Hochschule für Musik "Hanns Eisler" in Berlin when she was 16, and continued studying at the Hochschule für Musik und Darstellende Kunst Mannheim in Germany, the Geneva University of Music in Switzerland, and the Norwegian Academy of Music in Oslo, with the professors Pascal Devoyon, Paul Dan, Georg Sava, Ulrich Eisenlohr, and Einar Steen-Nøkleberg. She completed nine degrees (eight diplomas, one master's degree) with outstanding achievement, including two Konzertexamen degrees. In addition to her musical career, Fischer studied cultural and media management at the Hochschule für Musik und Theater Hamburg as well as event management.

Fischer speaks five languages: German, English, French, Korean and Spanish.

Concert performances 
Fischer has given numerous successful concerts in Europe, Asia, South America, and the United States and has performed in major concert halls, such as the Philharmonie Berlin, Carnegie Hall New York, Konzerthaus Berlin, Seoul Arts Center, Musikhalle Hamburg, Gumho Art Hall Seoul, Beijing Forbidden City Concert Hall, Shenzhen Concert Hall, Xinghai Concert Hall, Ruhrfestspielhaus Recklinghausen, Theater Wolfsburg, Woori Financial Art Hall Seoul, National Theatre Bangkok, Thailand Cultural Centre, Teatro Municipal de Las Condes Chile, Teatro Nacional de Costa Rica, Wiener Musikverein and the Wiener Konzerthaus. She has played as a soloist with the Berlin Radio Symphony Orchestra, Korean Chamber Orchestra, Berlin Symphony Orchestra, Baden-Baden Philharmonic Orchestra, Orquesta de Cámara de Valdivia, New Symphony Orchestra Berlin, New Philharmonie Westphalia and at the International Steinway Piano Festival, EXPO Hanover and Yeosu, Beethoven-Festival Bangkok, Korean Festival Seoul, and Schleswig-Holstein Music Festival. Fischer gave concerts during the state visits of the former German Federal President Roman Herzog to South Korea and Mongolia and performed in Bellevue Palace Berlin for former Federal Chancellor Helmut Kohl and Federal Chancellor Angela Merkel.

Awards 
Fischer has won 39 prizes and awards (first prizes, gold medals, audience awards) in national and international competitions: Jugend musiziert, International Steinway Piano Competition Berlin, International Queen Sophie Charlotte Competition, International Competition for Young People Berlin, Köster Classic Award-Klassik Radio Hamburg, Lions Club Mannheim Music Competition, Förderpreis Berliner Salon, Vienna Grand Prize Virtuoso, American Protégé International Concerto Competition, On Stage International Classical Music Competition, International Quebec Music Competition, Classic Superstar Award, and received 16 scholarships from renowned foundations: Konrad Adenauer Foundation, Academy of Arts, Berlin, Hans und Eugenia Jütting Foundation, Lutz-E. Adolf Foundation for highly gifted people, Kölner Gymnasial- und Stiftungsfonds, Franz Grothe Foundation, PE-Förderkreis, Gotthard Schierse Foundation, Yehudi Menuhin Live Music Now etc.

Teaching activities 
From 2010 to 2013, Fischer was the assistant piano teacher to Prof. Einar Steen-Nøkleberg at the Norwegian Academy of Music in Oslo and was appointed youngest visiting artist at the Chulalongkorn University in Bangkok. She regularly gives masterclasses in Europe, South America and Asia: Royal Danish Academy of Music, Silpakorn University, Princess Galyani Vadhana Institute of Music Bangkok, University of Panama, University of Costa Rica, Conservatorio de Música Universidad Mayor Chile, Sichuan Conservatory of Music, etc.

Discography 

 Caroline Fischer Piano (2006)
 Lisztomagia (2009)
 Pearls of Classical Music (2017)
 Piano Passion (2017)

All four CDs were released by Genuin classics.

Other activities 
In addition to her active performing career, Fischer is the chairwoman of the Kulturclub Berlin e.V. as well as the artistic director and organizer of the Rising Stars Grand Prix – International Music Competition Berlin, which is held in the Philharmonie Berlin.

Musical family tree 
Caroline Fischer studied i.a. with Prof. Dan and Prof. Sava. Both were pupils of György Halmos, who studied with Emil von Sauer. He was a student of Franz Liszt. Liszt received piano lessons from Czerny who, in his own youth, had been a student of Beethoven and Hummel. Beethoven himself studied with Haydn.

References

External links 
 

Classical pianists
German classical pianists
Living people
Musicians from Berlin
German women pianists
Women classical pianists
20th-century classical pianists
German people of Korean descent
21st-century classical musicians
21st-century classical pianists
1984 births
20th-century women pianists
21st-century women pianists